Marie-Joseph Charles des Acres de L'Aigle (7 November 1875 – 11 September 1935) was a French politician. He served as the mayor of Rethondes from 1908 to 1935. He also served as a member of the Chamber of Deputies from 1932 to 1935, representing Oise.

He was a direct descendant of the French King Louis XV through the monarch's illegitimate son Charles de Vintimille du Luc.

References

1875 births
1935 deaths
Politicians from Paris
Republican Centre politicians
Members of the 15th Chamber of Deputies of the French Third Republic
Mayors of places in Hauts-de-France